Mark Cavendish is a Manx professional racing cyclist for UCI WorldTeam . Originally a track cyclist in the madison, points race, and scratch race, he has also competed on the road since 2006. 

Cavendish is a cycling sprinter, and is a prolific winner of individual stages in stage races. Cavendish has won 34 Tour de France stages, putting him on the first spot on the all-time list together with Eddy Merckx. With 53 Grand Tour stage victories he is third on the all-time list, and his 161 professional victories – as of  – rank him joint third of all time.

Career highlights
2005
 Won the first of his Madison UCI Track Cycling World Championships titles.

2006
 Won the Scratch Race at the 2006 Commonwealth Games, bringing the Isle of Man's third ever gold medal at the Games.

2007
 He equalled Alessandro Petacchi's record of 11 professional wins in a début season.

2009
 Became the second British rider—after Tom Simpson—to win one of the five monuments of cycling with victory in the 2009 Milan – San Remo.
 Became first British rider to wear the general classification leader's pink jersey at the Giro d'Italia.
 Passed Barry Hoban's record of 8 for most Tour de France stage wins by a British rider and Chris Boardman's record of 41 for most professional victories by a British rider.

2010
 Became the second British rider—after Robert Millar—to win a stage in all three of the Grand Tours with victory at stage 12 of the 2010 Vuelta a España. He went on to win the points classification in the Vuelta a Espana, his first points classification victory in a Grand Tour.

2011
 Tied Piet Oellibrandt for the most wins in the Scheldeprijs one day semi-classic, with a third victory at the Antwerp race.
 At the 2011 Tour de France he became the first British rider to win the Tour de France points classification.
 Became the second British rider—after Tom Simpson—to win the UCI Road Race World Championship.

2012
 Became the first rider to win the final Champs-Élysées stage in the Tour de France four years in a row (2009–2012).
 Became the first rainbow jersey holder to win the final stage of the Tour de France.
 Became the most successful sprinter in Tour de France history with his 23rd stage victory giving him more mass start stage victories in the Tour than any other rider.
2013
 Claimed the second overall classification win of his career at the Tour of Qatar, with four consecutive stage victories out of six.
 Achieved 100 professional wins with victory on stage 12 of the 2013 Giro d'Italia.
 Completed his set of Grand Tour points classifications with his points classification win at the Giro d'Italia, becoming the 5th rider in history to do so.

2015
 Claimed the third overall victory of his career at the 2015 Dubai Tour, winning two of the four stages.

2016
 Claimed the fourth overall victory of his career at the Tour of Qatar, winning one of the five stages.
 Completed his set of overall classification lead jerseys in Grand Tours upon winning the opening stage of the Tour de France.
 Claimed first Olympic medal, winning the silver medal in the Rio 2016 Omnium.

2021
 Cavendish claimed his 50th Grand Tour stage victory, winning stage 6 of the 2021 Tour de France.
 Cavendish equalled Eddy Merckx's record for the most number of Tour de France stage wins.

Major results

Track

2001
 National Junior Championships
2nd Points race
3rd Scratch
2003
 National Junior Championships
1st  Kilo
2nd Scratch
2nd Sprint
2004
 National Championships
1st  Team pursuit
2nd Madison (with Ed Clancy)
 Madison, UIV Talent Cup
1st Bremen (with Geraint Thomas)
1st Munich (with Matt Brammeier)
 1st Madison, Revolution Series (with Ed Clancy)
2005
 1st  Madison, UCI World Championships (with Rob Hayles)
 1st  Points, UEC European Championships
 National Championships
1st  Team pursuit
2nd Scratch
 2005–06 UCI Track Cycling World Cup Classics
2nd  Team pursuit, Sydney
2nd  Team pursuit, Manchester
3rd  Madison, Sydney (with Tom White)
3rd  Madison, Manchester (with Rob Hayles)
2006
 1st  Scratch, Commonwealth Games
 3rd  Madison, UCI World Cup Classics, Sydney (with Geraint Thomas)
2007
 1st Scratch, Revolution Series 16
 2nd  Madison, 2006–07 UCI Track Cycling World Cup Classics, Beijing (with Bradley Wiggins)
2008
 1st  Madison (with Bradley Wiggins), UCI World Championships
 1st  Madison, National Championships (with Peter Kennaugh)
2011
 1st Scratch, Revolution Series 34
2014
 1st Six Days of Zürich (with Iljo Keisse)
 2nd Six Days of Ghent (with Iljo Keisse)
2015
 1st Madison, Revolution Series, Derby (with Bradley Wiggins)
2016
 1st  Madison, UCI World Championships (with Bradley Wiggins)
 1st Six Days of Ghent (with Bradley Wiggins)
 1st Omnium, Panevėžys Cup
 2nd  Omnium, Olympic Games
 2nd Six Days of London (with Bradley Wiggins)
2017
 2nd Six Days of London (with Peter Kennaugh)
2019
 2nd Six Days of London (with Owain Doull)

Road
Sources:

2003
 2nd Road race, National Junior Championships

2004 – Team Persil
 1st Stage 1 Girvan 3 Day

2005 – Team Sparkasse
 1st Stage 5 Tour de Berlin
 8th Rund um die Nürnberger Altstadt

2006 – Team Sparkasse,  (1)
 1st  Points classification, Tour of Britain
 1st Stage 3 Course de la Solidarité Olympique
 1st Stage 4 Thüringen Rundfahrt der U23
 2nd Overall Tour de Berlin
1st Stages 3b & 4
 4th Sparkassen Giro Bochum
 7th Road race, Commonwealth Games

2007 —  (11)
 1st Scheldeprijs
 Four Days of Dunkirk
1st  Points classification
1st Stages 3 & 6
 Tour of Britain
1st  Points classification
1st  Sprints classification
1st Prologue & Stage 1
 Danmark Rundt
1st  Points classification
1st Stage 6
 Eneco Tour
1st  Points classification
1st Stage 2
 Volta a Catalunya
1st Stages 2 & 6
 1st Stage 4 Ster Elektrotoer
 2nd Overall Circuit Franco-Belge
1st Stage 3
 6th Philadelphia International Championship

2008 —  (17)
 1st Scheldeprijs
 Tour de France
1st Stages 5, 8, 12 & 13
 Giro d'Italia
1st Stages 4 & 13
 Tour of Missouri
1st  Points classification
1st Stages 1, 2 & 6
 Tour of Ireland
1st Stages 1, 2 & 3
 Three Days of De Panne
1st Stages 2 & 3a
 1st Prologue Tour de Romandie
 1st Stage 5 Ster Elektrotoer
 5th Road race, National Championships

2009 —  (23)
 1st Milan–San Remo
 1st Sparkassen Giro Bochum
 Tour de France
1st Stages 2, 3, 10, 11, 19 & 21
Held  after Stages 2–6, 10 & 11
 Giro d'Italia
1st Stages 1 (TTT), 9, 11 & 13
Held  &  after Stages 1 & 2
 Tour of California
1st  Sprints classification
1st Stages 4 & 5
 Three Days of De Panne
1st  Points classification
1st Stages 2 & 3a
 Tour de Suisse
1st Stages 3 & 6
 Tour of Missouri
1st Stages 1 & 2
 1st Stage 7 Tirreno–Adriatico
 1st Stage 2 Tour of Ireland
 4th Amstel Curaçao Race
 8th UCI World Ranking
 9th Overall Tour of Qatar
1st Stages 4 & 6

2010 —  (11)
 Tour de France
1st Stages 5, 6, 11, 18 & 20
 Vuelta a España
1st  Points classification
1st Stages 1 (TTT), 12, 13 & 18
Held  after Stages 1 & 2
Held  after Stage 1
 1st Stage 2 Volta a Catalunya
 1st Stage 2 Tour de Romandie
 1st Stage 1 Tour of California
 2nd Clásica de Almería
 3rd Coppa Bernocchi
 7th Road race, Commonwealth Games

2011 —  (12)

 1st  Road race, UCI World Championships
 1st Scheldeprijs
 1st London–Surrey Cycle Classic
 Tour de France
1st  Points classification
1st Stages 5, 7, 11, 15 & 21
 Giro d'Italia
1st Stage 1 (TTT), 10 & 12
Held  after Stage 2
 Tour of Britain
1st Stages 1 & 8b
 1st Stage 6 Tour of Oman

2012 —  (15)
 1st  Overall Ster ZLM Toer
 1st Kuurne–Brussels–Kuurne
 Tour de France
1st Stages 2, 18 & 20
 Giro d'Italia
1st Stages 2, 5 & 13
Held  after Stages 2 & 11–19
1st Azzurri d'Italia classification
1st Most combative rider classification
 Tour of Britain
1st Stages 3, 4 & 8
 1st Stage 2 Tirreno–Adriatico
 1st Stage 6 Danmark Rundt
 6th Overall Tour of Qatar
1st Stages 3 & 5

2013 —  (19)
 1st  Road race, National Championships
 1st  Overall Tour of Qatar
1st  Points classification
1st Stages 3, 4, 5 & 6
 Giro d'Italia
1st  Points classification
1st Stages 1, 6, 12, 13 & 21
Held  after Stage 1
1st Azzurri d'Italia classification
1st Most combative rider classification
 Tour de France
1st Stages 5 & 13
 Combativity award Stage 13
 Tour of Britain
1st Stages 4, 7 & 8
 1st Stage 1 Tour de San Luis
 1st Stage 1 (TTT) Tirreno–Adriatico
 2nd Scheldeprijs
 3rd Overall Ster ZLM Toer
 6th Overall Driedaagse van West-Vlaanderen
 7th Overall Danmark Rundt
1st Stage 6
 9th Milan–San Remo
 10th Overall Three Days of De Panne
1st Stage 2

2014 —  (11)
 Tour of Turkey
1st  Points classification
1st Stages 1, 2, 4 & 8
 Tour du Poitou-Charentes
1st  Points classification
1st Stages 1 & 2
 Tour of California
1st Stages 1 & 8
 Tirreno–Adriatico
1st Stages 1 (TTT) & 6
 1st Stage 5 Volta ao Algarve
 1st Stage 4 Tour de Suisse
 5th Milan–San Remo
 5th Vattenfall Cyclassics

2015 —  (14)
 1st  Overall Dubai Tour
1st  Points classification
1st Stages 1 & 4
 1st Kuurne–Brussels–Kuurne
 1st Clásica de Almería
 Tour of California
1st  Points classification
1st Stages 1, 2, 5 & 8
 Tour of Turkey
1st  Points classification
1st Stages 1, 2 & 7
 1st Stage 7 Tour de France
 1st Stage 7 Tour de San Luis
 2nd Road race, National Championships

2016 —  (10)
 1st Overall UCI Asia Tour
 1st  Overall Tour of Qatar
1st Stage 1
 Tour de France
1st Stages 1, 3, 6 & 14
Held  after Stage 1
Held  after Stages 1, 3 & 6–9
 Abu Dhabi Tour
1st  Points classification
1st Stages 2 & 4
 1st Stage 2 Tour of Croatia
 1st Stage 8 Tour of California
 2nd  Road race, UCI World Championships
 2nd Road race, National Championships
 2nd Scheldeprijs
 6th Overall Giro della Toscana
 6th Paris–Tours

2017 –  (1)
 Abu Dhabi Tour
1st  Points classification
1st Stage 1
 6th Grand Prix d'Isbergues
 8th Overall Dubai Tour

2018 –  (1)
 1st Stage 3 Dubai Tour

2021 –  (10)
 1st Münsterland Giro
 Tour de France
1st  Points classification
1st Stages 4, 6, 10 & 13
 Tour of Turkey
1st Stages 2, 3, 4 & 8
 1st Stage 5 Tour of Belgium
 2nd Grote Prijs Jean-Pierre Monseré
 2nd Elfstedenronde
 3rd Scheldeprijs

2022 –  (5)
 1st  Road race, National Championships
 1st Milano–Torino
 1st Stage 3 Giro d'Italia
 1st Stage 2 UAE Tour
 1st Stage 2 Tour of Oman
 2nd Memorial Rik Van Steenbergen
 3rd Heistse Pijl

Classic results timeline
Source:

Major championship results timeline
Source:

Grand Tour record

Critériums

2004
 1st Tour of Britain Support Circuit
2005
 1st  National Criterium Championships
 1st Großer Silber–Pils Preis
 1st Kleve
 2nd Westerwald
 2nd Bad Oeynhausen
2006
 2nd Sparkassen Giro Bochum (Derny)
2007
 2nd Wetteren (Derny)
2008
 1st RaboRonde Heerlen
 1st Ronde van Made
 1st Nacht van Peer
 1st Herentals
 2nd Aalst
 3rd Profronde van Stiphout
2009
 1st Draai van de Kaai
 1st Profronde van Almelo
 1st Aalst
 1st Nacht van Peer
 1st Sparkassen Giro Bochum (Derny)
 1st Antwerpen (Derny)
2010
 1st Welser Sparkassen Innenstadt
 1st Linz
2011
 1st Profronde van Stiphout
 1st Profronde van Wateringen
 1st Wolvertem (Eddy Merckx)
 1st RaboRonde Heerlen
2012
 1st Ninove
 1st Lacq–Audejos
 1st Profronde van Surhuisterveen
 1st Oslo
 2nd Bavikhove
2017
 1st Saitama Criterium
2021
 1st Criterium Roeselare

Awards
Cavendish was the winner of the 2011 BBC Sports Personality of the Year Award, becoming the third cyclist (at the time) to win the award, after Tom Simpson and Chris Hoy.

References

External links
 
 
 Cycling Weekly – Profile and road racing victories of Mark Cavendish

Cavendish